White Transit Company was an Australian bus company operating route bus services on Sydney's Lower North Shore.

History
Charles Hicks commenced operations on 18 October 1924 with six White buses. It became a  public company in 1925. It had its headquarters in Crows Nest with the depot in Willoughby.

It quickly expanded to become the largest bus operator on the Lower North Shore. By 1925 it operated 11 routes, many of which connected with Sydney Ferries Limited services:
19: Balmoral Beach to Milsons Point wharf
40: Cammeray to Milsons Point wharf
51: Chatswood to Milsons Point wharf
52: Chatswood to Spit Junction
53: Chatswood to Milson Point wharf
95: Gladesville to Spit Junction
144: Manly to Spit Junction
149: Manly to Newport
214: Spit Junction to Milsons Point wharf
233: Willoughby to Milsons Point
236: Mosman to Musgrave Street wharf

In May 1927, route 95 ceased with the Gladesville to Lane Cove section taken over by Longueville Motor Bus Company. With the introduction of the Transport (Co-ordination) Act 1931  that banned buses from competing with trams, the business ceased on 31 October 1931.

Fleet
At its peak, the fleet totalled 33, most of which were Whites.

Depot
The depot was located at 462 Willoughby Road, Willoughby.

References

Bus companies of New South Wales
Bus transport in Sydney
Transport companies established in 1924
Transport companies disestablished in 1931
Australian companies established in 1924
1931 disestablishments in Australia
Defunct bus companies of Australia